Bahana may refer to:
 Bahana (1942 film)
 Bahana (1960 film)
 Bahana, an Indonesian Protestant magazine